= Bus width =

Bus width may refer to:

- Bus § Dimensions, the width of the road vehicle
- Bus width, in computer architecture, the amount of data that can be accessed or transmitted at a time
